Walter Ames Compton; (April 22, 1911October 11, 1990), was an American medical doctor, pharmacy researcher, and avid Japanese sword collector. He was the president of Miles Laboratories. Because he bought and returned several Japanese sword such as Bizen-Saburou Kunimune to Terukuni jinja, one of the National Treasures of Japan, he received 4th Class of Order of the Rising Sun from Government of Japan. Compton was an honorary member of The Society for Preservation of Japanese Art Swords.

Relevant literature

References

1911 births
1990 deaths
20th-century American businesspeople
American art collectors